Lake Denmark is a small lake about in Rockaway Township in Morris County, New Jersey, United States. Close by are Picatinny Lake in the southwest and the Green Pond in the northeast.

Landmarks and features 

 Nearby is the Picatinny Arsenal.

References

Denmark
Denmark
Rockaway Township, New Jersey